Skjold Church is a parish church of the Church of Norway in Bergen Municipality in Vestland county, Norway. It is located in the Skjold neighborhood in the city of Bergen. It is the church for the Skjold parish which is part of the Fana prosti (deanery) in the Diocese of Bjørgvin. The white brick church was built in a rectangular style in 1998 using designs by the architect Peder A. Ristesund. The church seats about 500 people.

History
The foundation stone was laid on 6 June 1997 and it was completed in less than one year. After its completion, the church was consecrated on 5 April 1998 by the Bishop Ole Hagesæther. The architect for the church was Peter A. Ristesund and Aud Hundskår was in charge of the interior design. The main sanctuary seats about 280 people, but it is expandable up to about 500 by moving some folding walls.

Media gallery

See also
List of churches in Bjørgvin

References

Churches in Bergen
Rectangular churches in Norway
Brick churches in Norway
20th-century Church of Norway church buildings
Churches completed in 1998
1998 establishments in Norway